Waldhausen is a municipality in the district of Zwettl in the Austrian state of Lower Austria.

Geography 
Waldhausen lies in the  Waldviertel in Lower Austria. About 42.86 percent of the municipality is forested.

References

Cities and towns in Zwettl District